E & J Gallo Winery is a winery and distributor headquartered in Modesto, California.  It was 
founded in 1933 by Ernest Gallo and Julio Gallo, and is the largest exporter of California wines. E & J Gallo Winery is the largest family-owned winery in the United States.

History
During Prohibition in the United States, Ernest and Julio Gallo grew grapes and sold them to eastern states where home winemaking was allowed.

On June 14, 1933, Ernest Gallo filed an application with the Prohibition administration to open a bonded wine storeroom in San Francisco. On June 20, his application was rejected. He was advised that in order to open a storeroom, he had to own a bonded winery. And in order to be bonded as a winery, he had to own vineyards. Ernest and Julio then took steps to bond a winery in the name of their newly formed partnership, E & J Gallo. They had stationery printed that included two designations next to their name: “winery” and “grape growers and shippers.” Their father's estate owned both the grape growing and shipping businesses as well as the vineyards required to establish a winery, at that juncture. Ernest applied on this letterhead to the Board of Alcohol for approval. He wrote that he and Julio were “grape growers with over 400 acres of grapes.” 

The two brothers started the winery in the fall of 1933, following the repeal of Prohibition. Ernest and Julio were competing against larger, more established, and better financed companies, including more than 800 wine companies established in California in the first few years after the repeal of Prohibition. Their starting capital was less than $6,000 (~$110,000 inflation-adjusted to 2017), with $5,000 of that borrowed by Ernest from his mother-in-law, Teresa Franzia. The brothers learned the craft of commercial winemaking by reading old, pre-Prohibition pamphlets published by the University of California which they retrieved from the basement of the Modesto Public Library. Julio was focused on the production of wine, and Ernest on its sale. They had just one tractor, and would run it permanently on 12/12 hour shifts. On the first year of activity, the brothers had produced 177,000 gallons of wine.

In 1957, E & J Gallo launched the fortified cheap white wine Thunderbird. In 1962, E & J Gallo launched the one gallon finger-ringed jug of cheap wine, Red Mountain, later Carlo Rossi Red Mountain, named after a winery above Oakdale that closed during Prohibition. Later, the US market began to move away from cheap wines. Ernest and Julio were the first to introduce brand management and modern merchandising to the wine industry, and led the way in bringing new products to store shelves. They were first in breakthrough quality initiatives such as long-term grower contracts for varietal grapes and grape research programs. They were also first to establish a truly significant foreign sales and marketing force to export California wines overseas. They pioneered wine advertising on television and launched many wine advertising campaigns. (One of these helped to popularize "Hymne", composed and performed by Vangelis, by featuring it as background music in some of its television commercials.) The company's 1960s ads were focused on associating their US-made wines with Europe's fine wine regions. In 1983, for the first time, the company put a vintage date on one of its wines, the 1978 Sonoma Cabernet Sauvignon.

During the 1980s and 1990s, E & J Gallo bought wine labels from Europe and Australia. By 1993, E & J Gallo was the country's largest winery, with a 25% share of the American wine market. Julio Gallo died in a car accident on 2 May 1993. Ernest died in 2007, and his son Joe Gallo took over the company as CEO.

In 2002 E & J Gallo purchased the Louis M. Martini Winery, giving the company its first Napa Valley location. On September 14, 2007, Martha Stewart Living Omnimedia announced a partnership with E & J Gallo Winery to produce a brand of wine labelled "Martha Stewart Vintage". In 2011, E & J Gallo sold Hornsby's hard cider to the C&C Group for an undisclosed amount and partnered with Boisset Collection to purchase the Mondavi estate. In 2017, E & J Gallo Winery bought the Napa Valley Stagecoach vineyard.

In April 2019, Constellation Brands Inc. announced a deal to sell wine brands, including Clos du Bois and Mark West, to E & J Gallo Winery for $1.7 billion. The deal was later amended, twice, to exclude sparkling wine brands Cook's California 'Champagne' and J. Roget American 'Champagne' (both retained by Constellation for four years post final agreement), Paul Masson Brandy which was divested to Sazerac Company Inc., Sheffield Cellars and Fairbanks divested to Precept Brands LLC, and its High Color Concentrates division was divested to Vie-Del Company. for an adjusted price agreement of $1.1B, of which $250 million is an earnout if brand performance provisions are met over a two-year period after closing. Agreement was finalized on January 6, 2021 for $810 million.

In 2020, the University of California, Merced was planning on opening its first new school since it launched, the Ernest & Julio Gallo School of Management, a multi-disciplinary school encompassing many different disciplines.

Legal disputes

In 1970, David Gallo was considering suing country rock group Boones Farm over the use of the name, Boones Farm.

In 1986, the Gallo brothers sued their younger brother Joseph for selling cheese branded with the Joseph Gallo Farms name. Joseph then counterclaimed, alleging that Ernest and Julio conspired to steal his share of the inheritance from their father. This claim included the winery, where the evidence submitted by Joseph's attorney suggested that it was actually started by their father. Joseph Gallo lost both suits and was forced to change the name of his business to Joseph Farms.

In the 1990s, Gallo Winery made an agreement with Gallo Pasta (a Spanish company) that the latter would not sell their pasta in the United States.
Gallo filed a cease-and-desist order
in April 2009 against "The Spanish Table", a Seattle-based specialty food retailer, for carrying the pasta despite the previous agreement with the maker.

In February 2010, twelve French winemakers and traders who had supplied wine to Gallo for its Red Bicyclette brand were found guilty in a French court of fraud, as they had claimed an inferior wine sold to Gallo was Pinot noir.

In October 2019, a lawsuit filed in the Eastern District of California claimed Gallo used patented technology without a license to develop their irrigation system.

Labor relations

The United Farm Workers (UFW) began boycotting Gallo in the summer of 1973 after Gallo did not renew their contract and signed with the International Brotherhood of Teamsters. Lead by Cesar Chavez, the UFW alleged that Gallo had worked out a "sweetheart deal" with the teamsters that offered fewer protections and that workers did not agree to teamster representation. An estimated 10,000 workers and supporters of the UFW marched 100 miles over the course of a week to the Gallo winery in Modesto.

Supporters of the boycott nationwide protested the buying and selling of Gallo wines, including student groups at Harvard University in Cambridge, MA who demanded a boycott of Gallo by the university and picketed local stores. The boycott against Gallo was called off by the UFW in 1978 after the union felt it had improved workers' rights of representation in labor disputes.

In October 2009, the California Agricultural Labor Relations Board (CALRB) revoked a 2007 election to eject the United Farm Workers from Gallo Winery, citing interference from Gallo. This was the second time in a decade a vote to remove the union was overturned due to allegations of Gallo illegally trying to influence proceedings; the other was a 2003 ruling in which the CALRB threw out an election citing a foreman improperly requesting signatures for the petition for the vote. Gallo appealed that decision.

Ecological impact
Gallo helped develop and implement the Code of Sustainable Wine Growing Practices, in collaboration with the Wine Institute and the California Association of Winegrape Growers.

The Code promotes sustainable practices which are environmentally sound, economically feasible and socially equitable. It covers virtually every aspect of the wine business including viticulture and grape growing, wine making, purchasing and building and maintaining productive relationships with neighbors and the local communities.

Gallo received ISO 14001 certification from the International Organization for Standardization. The certification was created to globally assist and guide companies to reduce their environmental impact.

In April 2009, the California State Water Resources Control Board served Gallo Glass Co. (a Gallo Winery subsidiary) with a cease and desist order and $73,000 fine for allegedly channeling water from the Russian River into an unlicensed reservoir; however, there are provisions for licensing the reservoir under proper monitoring of flow and capacity.

In March 2015, the California Department of Toxic Substances Control sued the E & J Gallo glass production plant in Modesto for improper storage and treatment of the glass bottles. E & J Gallo would use the dust collected by its air pollution control devices, and introduce it in the components of their glass bottles during production. E & J Gallo argued that this process was standard in the wine industry.

In February 2023, the Central Valley Regional Water Quality Control Board ordered E &J Gallo to pay $378,668 in fines for discharging irrigation and waste water into the Merced River, posing a threat to the health of fish and other aquatic life.

Wine brands

In addition to the Gallo Family Vineyards brand, the company makes, markets, and distributes wine under more than 100 other labels. The company also makes the low-end fortified wines Thunderbird and Night Train Express.

 André is one of the best-selling brands of sparkling wine in the United States. It is available in varietals including Brut, Extra Dry, Cold Duck, Blush, Spumante, strawberry, and peach-flavored California Champagne, among others. André's California Champagne is bulk-fermented.

 While the United States agreed in 2006 to not approve any new wine labels for US-produced products that include the term "Champagne," André is legally allowed to use the term as a grandfathered label. André's Brut California Champagne has been described as the sparkling wine that many people have noted was their first experience with this variety of wine. One champagne expert said it is "like ginger ale  – pale yellow in color, lemony and on the sweet side, with maybe an apple flavor as well and low bubbles".

 Carlo Rossi is a brand of wine produced by the E & J Gallo Winery. The brand was named after Charles Rossi, at the time a salesman for Gallo and a relation of the Gallo family by marriage. Charlie Rossi starred in TV ads for the brand in the 1970s. Carlo Rossi wines were at one point the second best selling brand in the United States. Carlo Rossi is reflected in popular culture in E-40's single, "Carlos Rossi."

 Boone's Farm was formerly a brand of apple wine produced by the E & J Gallo Winery. Now, flavors are malt-based instead of wine-based due to changes in tax laws. The brand is popular on college campuses due to its low price. Boone's Farm Beverages, served in 750 ml bottles, are often located in the cold box area of convenience stores across the United States. In some U.S. states, such as Utah, some Boone's Farm products are labeled as malt beverages and not as flavored apple/citrus wine products, as state liquor laws prohibit the sale of wine in grocery and convenience stores.
 Barefoot Wine, produced by Modesto-based Barefoot Cellars, was purchased by E & J Gallo Winery in 2005. The line offers 17 varietals and blends: Zinfandel, Shiraz, Merlot, Pinot noir, Cabernet Sauvignon, White Zinfandel, Moscato, Pinot grigio, Sauvignon blanc, Chardonnay, Riesling, Sweet Red, Brut Cuvee Chardonnay sparkling wine, Extra Dry sparkling wine, Pinot Grigio sparkling wine, Moscato Spumante, and Pink Cuvee sparkling wine. In January 2020, Barefoot Wine announced its launch of a line of wine-infused hard seltzer.

Additional brands

A–B

C–E

F–I

J–L

M

N–R

S–T

U–Z

Vineyard trials
Viticulturists at Gallo use their vineyard resources to trial new grape variety plantings in California wine regions in an effort to see which varieties grow best in various climates and soil types. One of the varieties that Gallo has been trialling in the San Joaquin Valley is the French wine grape Ederena.

Advertising
Advertising Age noted that "the Gallo experience," during the 1950s, '60s, '70s and 1980s, wore down many an ad agency. Ernest Gallo was listed in the periodical's "The TOUGHEST Clients" series.

Awards
E & J Gallo Winery was named the "Bon Appetit Winery of the Year" in the 1996, 1998, and 2001 San Francisco International Wine Competitions.

Intangible Business, a brand valuation firm, rated Gallo as the world's "Most Powerful Wine Brand" in 2006, 2007, 2008, and 2009.

See also

 Gallo family
 Napa County wine

Further reading

Ernest_Gallo California Wine Industry Oral History Series, University of California

References

External links

Wineries in California
Companies based in Stanislaus County, California
1933 establishments in California
American companies established in 1933
Food and drink companies established in 1933
American brands
Wine brands
Gallo family
Family-owned companies of the United States